The 1989–90 Lancashire Cup was the 77th occasion on which the completion had been held. Warrington won the trophy  by beating Oldham by the score of 24-16 in the final. The match was played at Knowsley Road, Eccleston, St Helens, Merseyside, (historically in the county of Lancashire). The attendance was 9.990 and receipts were £41,804.

Background 

This season, Chorley Borough (see note 1) joined the league, bringing the total number of entrants up to  17.
This necessitated the need for a preliminary round (consisting of just 1 game). The first round (proper) then involved 16 clubs, thus removing the need of  any  “blank” or “dummy” fixtures or any byes.

Competition and results

Preliminary round 
Involved  1 match and 2 clubs

Round 1 
Involved  8 matches (with no byes) and 16 clubs

Round 2 - Quarter-finals 
Involved 4 matches and 8 clubs

Round 3 – Semi-finals  
Involved 2 matches and 4 clubs

Final

Teams and scorers 

Scoring - Try = four points - Goal = two points - Drop goal = one point

The road to success

Notes  
1 * Chorley Borough (2) were elected to the league during the close season after the previous team of the same name moved out and to Altrincham as Trafford Borough. This was the first Lancashire Cup match played by the newly formed and elected club and also to be played at the new venue, home of  Chorley F.C. 
2 * The first Lancashire Cup match played by the reformed and newly named Trafford Borough     The half time score was 2-6 in favour of Trafford Borough
3 * Match played at Leigh's Hilton Park
4 * Match played at Carlisle United's Brunton Park 
5 * This was the 25th successive defeat for Runcorn Highfield 
6 * The venue is given by RUGBYLEAGUEprojects as Chiswick Poly Sports Grd - Rothmans Rugby League Yearbook 1990–91 gives the venue as Claremont Road stadium which, at that date, was the home ground of Hendon F.C. 
7 * The first Lancashire Cup match to be played on this ground, one of many used by Fulham during the nomadic period between 1985-1993
8 * Knowsley Road was the home ground of St. Helens from 1890 to 2010. The final capacity was in the region of 18,000, although the actual record attendance was 35,695, set on 26 December 1949, for a league game between St Helens and Wigan

See also 
1989–90 Rugby Football League season
Rugby league county cups

References

External links
Saints Heritage Society
1896–97 Northern Rugby Football Union season at wigan.rlfans.com 
Hull&Proud Fixtures & Results 1896/1897
Widnes Vikings - One team, one passion Season In Review - 1896–97
The Northern Union at warringtonwolves.org

RFL Lancashire Cup
Lancashire Cup